Sōshū or Soshu may refer to:

 Sagami Province (相模国)

 Fusa Province (総国)
 Kazusa Province (上総国)
 Shimōsa Province (下総国)